The North Star Grand Prix is a men's and women's road bicycle racing stage race held each June in Minnesota, United States, as part of the North Star Bicycle Festival. An event was added in North Mankato in 2016. The North Star Grand Prix is one of only four races on the USA Cycling Pro Road Tour.
The 2010 Grand Prix had six stages: three criteriums, two road races and a time trial.

The event was known as the Nature Valley Grand Prix until 2013, but was renamed following sponsorship changes. The North Star Bicycle Festival is run by volunteers, proceeds going to  Special Olympics Minnesota.

The North Star Grand Prix was cancelled in 2018, which would have been its 20th year.  An attempt to bring it back in 2019 failed since it had no cash sponsors and a GoFundMe campaign raised only 6% of the needed funds.

Winners

Men's Elite/Pro Race

References

External links 
 Official site
 Coverage

 
Cycling in Minnesota
Cycle races in the United States
Women's road bicycle races
Recurring sporting events established in 2001
2001 establishments in Minnesota